Monster Monster is the second album by American rock band The Almost, released on November 3, 2009.

Background
The Almost released their debut album, Southern Weather in 2007. On November 9, 2008, it was announced that the band had parted ways with drummer Kenny Bozich. Later that month, the band released a holiday-themed EP, No Gift to Bring.

Recording
On April 29, 2009, the band arrived at Dark Horse Recording studio in Franklin, Tennessee. The recording process was documented with tweets, a live Stickam stream, and blogs. Like the band's debut Southern Weather, Monster Monster was produced by Aaron Sprinkle. Due to the band's lack of a drummer at the time, lead singer Aaron Gillespie played drums for the record. After the recording and mastering of the record, Gillespie stated, "This now feels like a real band. Everyone gave up a piece of his own agenda for the good of the final result. And that's how you end up with something special. They supplied the bricks and we built this house together." On May 7, a studio update was posted online, followed by another on May 26.

Release
The first single from the album is "Hands" and it was released onto radio stations October 2, 2009, and it has cracked the Top 5 on the Christian Rock charts. When speaking of touring, Gillespie noted that "[The Almost] plan on hitting it as hard as we can." Vilardi concurred with "We'd like to leave and not come back for two years." In October and November, the group supported the Used on their headlining US tour. On November 23, 2009, a music video was released for "Lonely Wheel". In February and March 2010, the band performed at Soundwave festival in Australia. The third track on the album, "No I Don't," debuted on the Christian Rock chart on March 5.

Track listing

Personnel
The Almost
Aaron Gillespie – lead vocals, percussion, rhythm guitar, banjo, keyboards, piano
Jay Vilardi – guitar
Dusty Redmon – guitar
Alex Aponte – bass
Joe Musten - drums

Additional musicians
John Davis - steel guitar 
Chris Scruggs - steel guitar
Josiah Holland - keyboards

Production
Aaron Sprinkle - producer, guitar, vocals, keyboards
Zach Blackstone - assistant
Jordan Butcher - art direction, design
Mike Carr - assistant engineer
Matt Carter (Emery) - mixing
Roberto Chamorro - photography
Brandon Ebel - A&R, executive producer
Ted Jensen - mastering
Brian Kroll - A&R
Ethan Luck - photography
J.R. McNeely - mixing
Randy Nichols - management
Dave Powell (Emery) - drum technician
Melisssa Sabo - assistant
Rob "Just Fine" Stevenson - A&R
Matt Watts - assistant

Monster EP 
Monster EP was released on October 6, 2009, one month before the launch of Monster Monster. It was sold exclusively through retail store Hot Topic, the band's website and a tour supporting Monster Monster.

The song "Hands" is the first single, which will include a music video, from Monster Monster and the EP to be released to radio stations. The EP packaging is a double-disc digipak, one of the discs contain the music and the other contains no data at all, but depicts the artwork that Monster Monster will have on the disc's label along with lyrics and printed track listing.

References

2009 albums
The Almost albums
Virgin Records albums
Tooth & Nail Records albums
Albums produced by Aaron Sprinkle